Fusisporium is a genus of fungi belonging to the family Nectriaceae.

The genus was first described by Johann Heinrich Friedrich Link in 1809.

Species:
 Fusisporium aurantiacum
 Fusisporium betae
 Fusisporium candidum

References

Nectriaceae genera